Nassarius subspinosus, common name the prickly dog whelk, is a species of sea snail, a marine gastropod mollusk in the family Nassariidae, the nassa mud snails or dog whelks.

Description
The length of the shell varies between 10 mm and 20 mm.

The shell is ovate and conical. The spire is composed of six slightly convex whorls, somewhat flattened at their upper part, ornamented with longitudinal, spinous folds. The body whorl supports two or three rows of spinous, distant tubercles. Besides, the whole shell is crossed by pretty fine, transverse striae, more apparent towards the base. The aperture is sub-rounded. The outer lip is margined externally, and striated internally. The color of this shell is grayish, with irregular transverse bands of a slate or violet color. The tubercles are sometimes white, and often brown lines cross them.

Distribution
This marine species occurs off Central and East Indian Ocean, Tanzania, East India, Andaman Islands, the Philippines, Singapore, Indonesia, Indo-China, China, Oceania (Fiji, Solomon Islands), Papua New Guinea and Australia (Western Australia)

References

 Dunker, G. 1847. Diagnoses Buccinorum quorundam novorum. Zeitschrift für Malakozoologie 4: 59–64
 Quoy, J.R.C. & Gaimard, J.P. 1833. Voyage de découvertes de l'Astrolabe, exécuté par ordre du Roi, pendant les années 1826–1829. Paris : J. Tastu Zoologie Vol. 2 pp. 321–686.
 Gould, A.A. 1850. Descriptions of the shells brought home by the U.S. Exploring Expedition (cont.). Proceedings of the Boston Society of Natural History 3: 151–156  
 Spry, J.F. (1961). The sea shells of Dar es Salaam: Gastropods. Tanganyika Notes and Records 56
 Cernohorsky, W.O. 1984. Systematics of the family Nassariidae (Mollusca: Gastropoda). Bulletin of the Auckland Institute and Museum. Auckland, New Zealand 14: 1–356
 Wilson, B. 1994. Australian Marine Shells. Prosobranch Gastropods. Kallaroo, WA : Odyssey Publishing Vol. 2 370 pp.
 Higo, S., Callomon, P. & Goto, Y. 1999. Catalogue and Bibliography of the Marine Shell-bearing Mollusca of Japan. Japan : Elle Scientific Publications 749 pp.
 Marais J.P. & Kilburn R.N. (2010) Nassariidae. pp. 138–173, in: Marais A.P. & Seccombe A.D. (eds), Identification guide to the seashells of South Africa. Volume 1. Groenkloof: Centre for Molluscan Studies. 376 pp.

External links
 Nevill G. & Nevill H. (1874). Descriptions of new marine Mollusca from the Indian Ocean. Journal of the Asiatic Society of Bengal. 43(2): 21-30, 1 pl
 Galindo, L. A.; Puillandre, N.; Utge, J.; Lozouet, P.; Bouchet, P. (2016). The phylogeny and systematics of the Nassariidae revisited (Gastropoda, Buccinoidea). Molecular Phylogenetics and Evolution. 99: 337-353
 

Nassariidae
Gastropods described in 1822